The 2018–19 American International Yellow Jackets men's ice hockey season was the 71st season of play for the program, the 23rd at the Division I level, and the 16th season in the Atlantic Hockey conference. The Yellow Jackets represented American International College and were coached by Eric Lang, in his 3rd season.

Season
Fresh off of their best performance since joining Division I in 1999, American International upped the difficulty of their season by scheduling several strong opponents for 2019. They performed well in the season opener against Providence but then went through a bit of a skid as they tried to settle on the team's starting goaltender. By mid-November the team seemed to be stuck in the mud with an inconsistent offense and a porous defense. A stunning series sweep of Air Force, however, seemed to put the Yellow Jackets back on track; Zackarias Skog shut out the Falcons in both games and took full control of the AIC net for the remainder of the season. The team's offense, too, found its footing the same weekend and proved to be much more dependable afterwards.

A 5-game winning streak helped push American International towards the top of the conference standings and the Yellow Jackets looked primed to compile their first winning season in 25 years. The only real trouble for AIC looked to be its performance in non-conference games. A loss to Massachusetts just after new year's was their third strait embarrassing defeat by a team outside of their conference. By all appearances, the Yellow Jackets looked to be able to compete in Atlantic Hockey, but woefully unprepared for the upper echelon of college hockey.

After dropping its second weekend to RIT that year, AIC went on an 8–1 run that propelled them to the top of the standings. Not only did it guarantee the Yellow Jackets a winning record, but it gave them an 8-point cushion for the conference title. While the rest of Atlantic Hockey scrambled to catch up, American International headed off to Arizona and took on the 12th-ranked Sun Devils. While their non-conference losing streak continued, AIC fared far better than they had previously, fighting back from a 3-goal deficit in the second game to force overtime.

After returning home, the teams chasing AIC had made up some ground but not enough. The Yellow Jackets split their final weekend and finished 3 points ahead of second place to take their first Atlantic Hockey crown and the first regular season championship of any kind for the program. While the team was riding high, their placement in the Pairwise ranks left the team with only one way of making the NCAA Tournament; a conference championship.

AIC received a bye into the conference quarterfinal and welcomed Army for its final home games of the year. They got a tough fight from the service academy, but still managed to pull out a win in the series, advancing to a semifinal round for the first time since 1990. Despite facing the 8th-seed in the next round, AIC was pushed to the limit and saw the game go into overtime. Fortunately, the team's leading scorer, Blake Christensen, found the back of the net first and sent American International to the championship game. The match with Niagara was nearly a carbon-copy of the semifinal, with Christensen assisting on the winning goal in overtime. American International, with its first Atlantic Hockey championship, received the conference's automatic bid and was set to play the first NCAA tournament game in its 71-year history.

Entering the tournament, AIC was unsurprisingly ranked as the 16th-and last team in the field. They travelled out to North Dakota to face top-seeded St. Cloud State and weren't expect to amount to much. The game began slow, with both teams only recording 6 shots in the first period, but AIC found itself with a 1–0 lead. The Huskies began attacking the Yellow Jacket goal in the second but Skog stood firm and turned aside all shots. Instead, it was American International who scored to double their advantage and as the third began, St. Cloud began to become more frantic. The Huskies cut the lead in half with a power play marker around the mid-point of the period, but that was all that Skog and the defense would allow. Despite firing nearly three times as many shots, St. Cloud went down to defeat in American International's first NCAA tournament game.

While AIC couldn't continue their good fortune for another game, the team had already produced the best season in program history and had announced their arrival on the national stage with a tremendous upset victory.

Departures

Recruiting

Roster

|}

Standings

Schedule and results

|-
!colspan=12 style=";" | Regular season

|-
!colspan=12 style=";" | 
|- align="center" bgcolor="#e0e0e0"

|- align="center" bgcolor="#e0e0e0"
|colspan=12|American International Won Series 2–1

|-
!colspan=12 style=";" |

Scoring statistics

Goaltending statistics

Rankings

USCHO did not release a poll in Week 25.

Awards and honors

References

2018–19
American International
American International
American International
American International